Dohan may refer to:

 A resident of Doha, Qatar
 Dohan, village in the municipality of Bouillon, Belgium;
 Edith Hall Dohan (1877-1943), American archaeologist
 Meital Dohan, Israeli actress;
 F. Curtis Dohan, American physician.